The Apapa Hoard is an important collection of medieval bronze jewellery found at Apapa near Lagos, Nigeria. Dating to the early 16th Century, the hoard has been part of the British Museum's collection since 1930.

Description
Items from the treasure consist entirely of bronze jewellery. They include a pair of wire bracelets, two bracelets designed in the form of interlocking animals, two staff-mounts with pendant bells, two ring-shaped armlets, a group of bells, a ring with cascabels and a breast plate in the shape of a ram's head with pendant bells. The latter object is the most prestigious item from the hoard and is one of the finest cast bronzes ever found in southern Nigeria.

Discovery
The hoard was discovered by accident in 1907 when a well was being dug to a depth of 3 metres. The jewellery would have been worn by an elite member of a local tribe living in 15th-16th centuries and has been attributed by scholars to the Yoruba Kingdom of Owo, which was for a long time under the control of the Benin Empire. Soon after its discovery, the hoard was acquired by a private collector who later sold it to the British Museum in 1930.

See also
Bronze Head from Ife
Bronze Head of Queen Idia

References

Further reading
Mack J (ed), Africa, Arts and Cultures, London 2005
Fagg WB, 'A bronze breastplate from Lagos, British Museum Quarterly, Vol V, 1930
Fagg WB, Nigerian Images, London Lund Humphries, 1963

Benin art
Ethnographic objects in the British Museum
African objects in the British Museum
Nigerian art
Bronze sculptures in the United Kingdom
Yoruba art
Nigeria–United Kingdom relations